Amt Schenkenländchen is an Amt ("collective municipality") in the district of Dahme-Spreewald, in Brandenburg, Germany. Its seat is in the town Teupitz. Its name is associated with the Schenk von Landsberg family.

The Amt Schenkenländchen consists of the following municipalities:
Groß Köris
Halbe
Märkisch Buchholz
Münchehofe
Schwerin
Teupitz

Demography

References

Schenkenlandchen
Dahme-Spreewald